= Traversi Garage =

- Garage Traversi
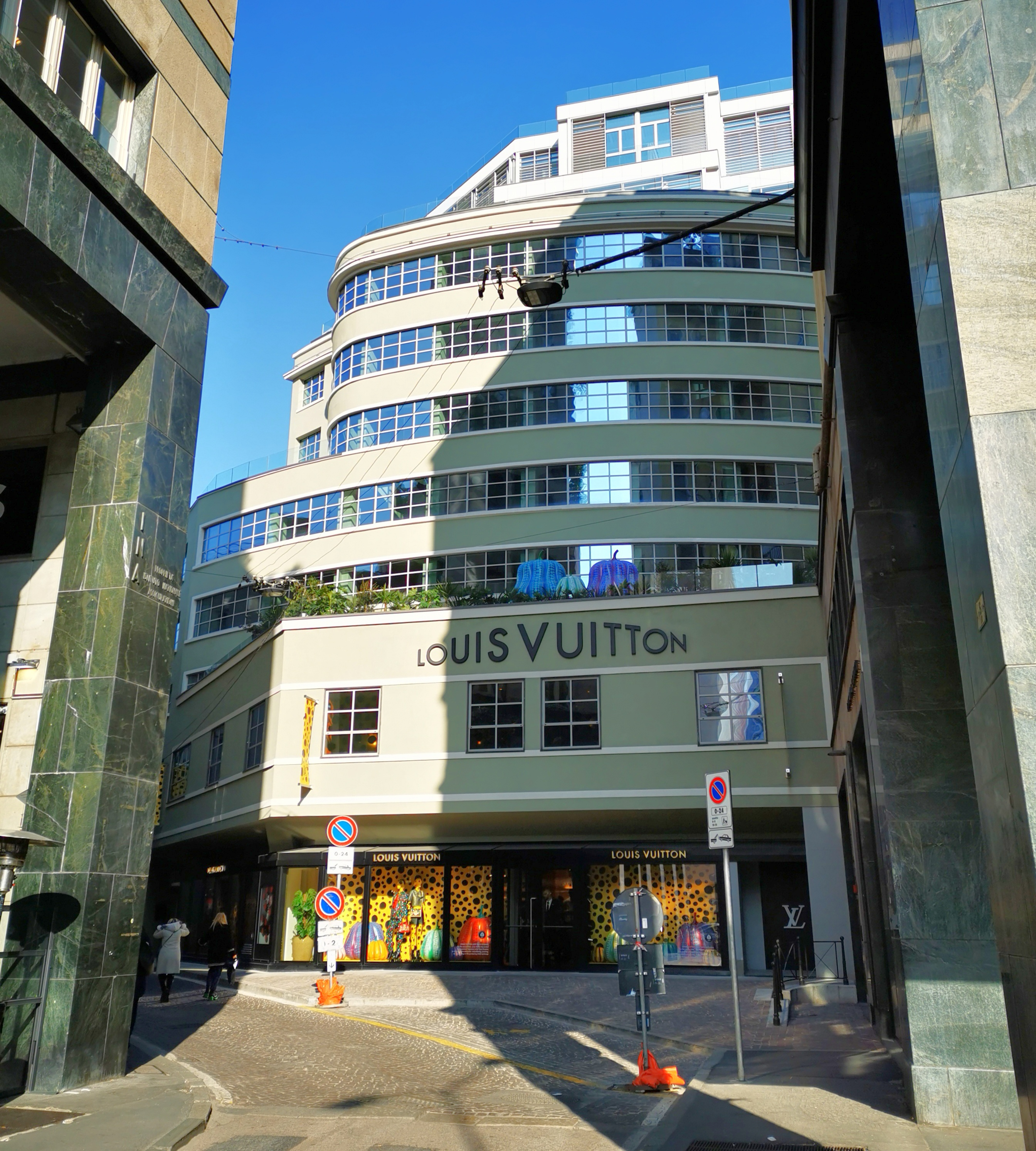
- The Traversi Garage in 2023
- Click on the map for a fullscreen view

General information
- Location: Milan, Italy
- Coordinates: 45°28′02.59″N 9°11′50.12″E

The Traversi Garage (Italian: Garage Traversi) is a building located in Milan, Italy.

== History ==
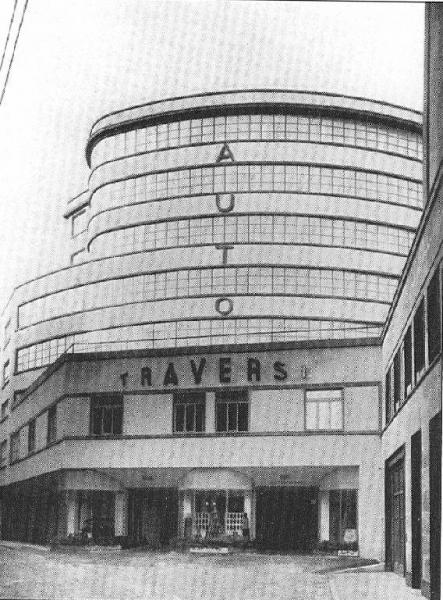
The building serving its original function as a car park

The building, which was the first multi-storey car park in Milan, was erected in 1938 based on a design by architects Giuseppe De Min and Alessandro Rimini was erected in 1938 based on a design by architects Giuseppe De Min for the Società Anonima Resta Gestioni Immobiliari, which owned the plot on which it was built. It was completed in 1939.

Protected by the cultural heritage authority, the parking facility was closed in 2003, and for several years part of it housed an outlet store, which closed between 2016 and 2017. In 2018, the then-vacant building was acquired by BNP Paribas.

The complex reopened in January 2023 as a Louis Vuitton store, following a renovation that included the restoration of its original sage green colour, the addition of flower beds, and the construction of a three-storey structure on its top with panoramic terraces.
